Roderick Oliver Redman FRS (1905–1975) was Professor of Astronomy at the University of Cambridge.

Education 

Redman was born at Rodborough near Stroud, Gloucestershire and educated at Marling School and St John's College, Cambridge.

Career 

He was director of the University of Cambridge Observatories 1947–72. He had started his career at the Dominion Astrophysical Observatory (DAO) in Victoria, British Columbia 1928–31. He moved to Cambridge University, UK and was Assistant Director at the Solar Physics Observatory 1931–37. he was then Chief Assistant at the Oxford University Radcliffe Observatory outside Pretoria, South Africa from 1939–1947. Among his doctoral students were John Hutchings, Colin Scarfe, and Gordon Walker. He received his Ph.D. under the direction of Arthur Stanley Eddington in 1931. In 1946 he was elected a Fellow of the Royal Society.

From 1947 to 1972 he was Director of Combined Observatories. He served as president of the Royal Astronomical Society from 1959 to 1961.

Honors 

The inner main-belt asteroid 7886 Redman, discovered by Canadian astronomer David D. Balam in 1993, has been named in his memory, jointly with the astronomer Russell Ormond Redman. No relation except for their shared initials and the fact that both worked at the DAO during significant parts of their careers. The official naming citation was published on 10 June 1998.

References 
 

1905 births
1975 deaths
Academics of the University of Cambridge
Alumni of St John's College, Cambridge
Fellows of the Royal Society
People educated at Marling School
Presidents of the Royal Astronomical Society
People from Rodborough